C. intermedia may refer to:
 Camissonia intermedia, the intermediate suncup, a plant species native to California and Baja California
 Cattleya intermedia, the intermediate cattleya, an orchid species
 Cavia intermedia, the Santa Catarina's Guinea pig or Moleques do Sul Guinea pig, a mammal species found in Brazil on the small island of Moleques do Sul in the state of Santa Catarina
 Clathrina intermedia, a sponge species
 Clidemia intermedia, a flowering plant species in the genus Clidemia
 Corymbia intermedia, the pink bloodwood, a plant species native to Queensland and New South Wales
 Crepis intermedia, the limestone hawksbeard, a flowering plant species native to western North America
 Cryptantha intermedia, the common cryptantha, clearwater cryptantha and nievitas, a wildflower species native from British Columbia to Baja California
 Cucullia intermedia, the dusky hooded owlet, intermediate cucullia, goldenrod cutworm or intermediate hooded owlet, a moth species found in North America 
 Cunninghamella intermedia, a fungus species
 Cyclopia intermedia, the honeybush, a plant species used to make an infusion in the same manner as tea in the southwest and southeast of South Africa

Synonyms 
 Caecilia intermedia, a synonym for Caecilia nigricans, an amphibian species found in Colombia, Ecuador and Panama

See also 
 Intermedia (disambiguation)